Shrezzers (stylized as SHREZZERS) is an international progressive metal band, originally formed under the name Shredding Brazzers in 2016.

Shrezzers is known for usage of saxophone in almost every song which is non-typical and unique within the genre of progressive metal.

History

Formation and Relationships (2016-2019) 
The band was formed as Shredding Brazzers by drummer/vocalist Mark Mironov (ex-Betraying the Martyrs, ex-My Autumn, Defying Decay, Deadkedы), guitarists Vyacheslav "ChocoSlayc" Kavlenas (ex-Wildways, ex-Fail Emotions, ex-Apostate CZ, Change of Loyalty) and Vitalii Molokanov (Change of Loyalty), saxophonist Artem Subichev, and vocalist Sam Arrag (ex-Apart and Divided) in 2016. The band's original name "Shredding Brazzers" referred to shred guitar, used the name and yellow "ZZ" stylization of the pornographic website Brazzers, and was changed in 2017 to a portmanteau "Shrezzers" to avoid copyright issues.

The group gained attention after premiering their debut single, Mystery, on July 7, 2016, which featured a guest guitarist Dmitry Demyanenko (Shokran), and was especially praised for its saxophone solo, non-typical for the genre.

On November 12, 2018, Shrezzers released an XXXTentacion cover, SAD!, as a non-album single.

On January 4, 2019, Shrezzers released their debut album, Relationships, which featured numerous guest artists including Ronnie Canizaro (Born of Osiris), Jared Dines, Aaron Marshall (Intervals), Aaron Matts (ten56., ex-Betraying the Martyrs), Dmitry Demyanenko (Shokran), Toli Wild (Wildways), and a Russian virtuoso guitarist Sergey Golovin. Relationships charted on #12 at iTunes Russia's Rock Albums. Limited CD press of the album was released independently in Russia, and in Japan in 2020 via Tower Records.

On April 24, 2019, an instrumental version of Relationships titled Relationshits was released.

On May 25 and 26, 2019, Shrezzers debuted live supporting Electric Callboy at their gigs in Moscow and Saint Petersburg. On September 29, 2019, the band played at Euroblast Festival in Cologne, Germany.

In September-October 2019, Shrezzers toured as a supporting act on Betraying the Martyrs' European Parasite Tour.

In November 2019, Shrezzers toured Japan with support from local acts Paledusk, Victim of Deception, Ailiph Doepa, Lenz and The Local Pints. Shortly after the tour it was announced that Sam Arrag was no longer in the band.

Vocalist change and SEX & SAX (2020–present) 
On January 27, 2020, Shrezzers released a non-album single Noodles, the last one featuring Sam Arrag on vocals, accompanied by a music video shot during their 2019 Japan tour.

From January to February 2020, Shrezzers held an online contest where participants were asked to sing a cover version of one of their songs and the winners would receive various merchandise. It was later revealed the band used the contest to seek out a replacement vocalist.

In September 2020, Peruvian Diego Silva Málaga premiered as the new singer for the group on their single Phoenix, accompanied by a music video.

On February 26, 2021, Shrezzers released a single Demure which features Veil of Maya's vocalist Lukas Magyar. On November 19, 2021, UVB-76 featuring CJ McMahon of Thy Art is Murder was released.

Throughout 2022, Shrezzers released an acoustic version of Delight and new singles Gambit featuring Adam Bentley from progressive fusion band Arch Echo, and Libertad featuring Michael Barr from Volumes.

On February 17, 2023, the follow-up album titled SEX & SAX was released. It features all the previously released singles since Phoenix, as well as 8 new songs with guest appearances from Kaito Nagai (Paledusk) and Cameron "C$L" Losch (Born of Osiris) among others.

Band members

Current
 Mark Mironov - drums, vocals (2016–present)
 Vyacheslav "ChocoSlayc" Kavlenas - guitar (2016–present)
 Vitalii Molokanov - guitar (2016–present)
 Artem Subichev - saxophone (2016–present)
 Diego Silva Málaga - vocals (2020–present)

Former
 Sam Arrag - vocals (2016–2019)

Discography
Studio albums
 Relationships (2019)
 Relationshits (Instrumental) (2019)
 SEX & SAX (2023)

Singles
 Mystery (feat. Dmitry Demyanenko) (2016)
 Vivacious (2016)
 Spotlight (2017)
 Delight (2017)
 E.M.O.J.I.Q.U.E.E.N. (feat. Jared Dines & TWild) (2017)
 SAD! (XXXTentacion cover) (2018)
 Anaraak (feat. Ronnie Canizaro) (2019)
 Noodles (2020)
 Phoenix (2020)
 Demure (feat. Lukas Magyar) (2021)
 UVB-76 (feat. CJ McMahon) (2021)
 Delight (acoustic) (2022)
 Gambit (feat. Adam Bentley) (2022)
 Libertad (feat. Michael Barr) (2022)
 Temperatura (2023)

Videography

References

External links

 Shrezzers discography at Discogs

Musical groups established in 2016
Musical groups from Saint Petersburg